Tokio may refer to:
 , the capital of Japan, used primarily in non-English-speaking countries

 may also refer to:

Music 
 Tokio (band), a Japanese pop/rock band
 Tokio (album), their debut album
 Tokio Hotel, a German rock band
 Tokio, a Japanese singer Kenji Sawada's album and song

Places 
 Tokio, North Dakota, a community in the United States
 Tokio, Texas, a community in the United States
 Tokio, Washington, a ghost town

Companies and other organizations 
 Tokio Marine Nichido, a Japanese insurance company
 Tokio Millennium Re Ltd., a reinsurance company

Other uses 
 Tokio (given name), a masculine Japanese given name
 498 Tokio, a minor planet
 Toki, a 1986 video game originally released as Scramble Formation
 City of Tokio, an iron steamship built in 1874 in the USA
 Tokio (yacht)
 Tokio Express, a container ship that caused the great Lego spill of 1997
 Tokio (software), asynchronous input/output software library for the Rust programming language

See also 
 Tokyo (disambiguation)